The Tucumán mountain finch (Poospiza baeri) is a species of bird in the family Thraupidae. It is endemic to shrubby woodland in the Andes of north-western Argentina, but it is possible its distribution extends marginally into adjacent Bolivia. Together with the closely related Cochabamba mountain finch, it is placed in the genus Poospiza. It is threatened by habitat loss.

References

Tucumán mountain finch
Birds of the Southern Andean Yungas
Endemic birds of Argentina
Tucumán mountain finch
Taxonomy articles created by Polbot